2016 Regional League Division 2 Bangkok & Eastern Region is the 1st season of the League competition since its establishment in 2016. It is in the third tier of the Thai football league system. The league winners and runners up will qualify for the 2016 Regional League Division 2 champions league round. This zone is new zone.

Changes from Last Season

Banned and Relegated Clubs

Inter Pattaya withdrew from the league after 4 games. They were accused of owing unpaid wages to players in 2015, the Football Association of Thailand Regional League part to banned 2 years and will relegate to play Division 3 on bangkok&eastern zone 2018 seasons. This is full paper judgement

Team Changes

Returning Clubs

 Look Isan and Samut Prakan United are returning to the league after a 1-year break.

Renamed Clubs

 Pakchong United renamed Look Isan

Relocated Clubs

Pathum Thani United and Royal Thai Fleet  re-located to the Regional League Bangkok & Eastern Division from the Central & Eastern Division 2015.
Kasem Bundit University and Customs United re-located to the Regional League Bangkok & field Division from the Bangkok & field Division 2015.
Raj Pracha re-located to the Regional League Central & Western Division from the Central & Western Division 2015.

Expansion Clubs

Sinthana Kabinburi, Inter Pattaya, Pattaya and Banbung United Renamed from Laem Chabang City joined the newly expanded league setup.

Withdrawn Clubs

Inter Pattaya  club withdrew after played 4 games in 2016

Stadium and locations

League table

Results

Season statistics

Top scorers
As of 3 September 2016.

See also
 2016 Thai Premier League
 2016 Thai Division 1 League
 2016 Regional League Division 2
 2016 Thai FA Cup
 2016 Thai League Cup
 2016 Kor Royal Cup

References

External links
 Division 2

Regional League Bangkok Area Division seasons